Nicolas Garcia (born September 30, 1986) is a Colombian footballer. He currently plays for Brooklyn Knights in the USL Premier Development League.

Career
Garcia began his career in his native Colombia, playing for Millonarios in Fútbol Profesional Colombiano. He signed with Charlotte Eagles in 2009, and made his debut for the team on May 1, 2009, in a game against Crystal Palace Baltimore., but made just one more appearance for the club before being released at the end of the year.

Having been unable to secure a professional contract elsewhere, Garcia signed to play for the Brooklyn Knights in the USL Premier Development League in 2010.

References

External links
 Charlotte Eagles bio

1986 births
Living people
Colombian footballers
Millonarios F.C. players
Charlotte Eagles players
Brooklyn Knights players
USL Second Division players
USL League Two players
Association football defenders
People from Bucaramanga
Sportspeople from Santander Department
21st-century Colombian people